The Symphony No. 2, Op. 40 by Malcolm Arnold is a symphony dating from 1953.  Arnold composed the symphony on commission from the Bournemouth Winter Garden's Society.  He dedicated the score to the Bournemouth Symphony Orchestra and conductor Charles Groves, who premiered the work on 25 May 1953.

The work is in four movements:

I. Allegretto
II. Vivace
III. Lento
IV. Allegro con brio

Commentators such as Donald Mitchell and Christopher Stasiak have noted Arnold's use of what they characterise as "Mahlerian clichés", or Mahlerian style and construction, in this symphony. By contrast, Hugo Cole observed that it is "a startlingly original work... bold enough to flout 'the spirit of the age' so outrageously."

Notable performances
First performance: 25 May 1953 by the Bournemouth Symphony Orchestra conducted by Charles Groves
London premiere: 3 June 1953 by the London Philharmonic Orchestra conducted by the composer
First broadcast: 9 February 1954 by the BBC Scottish Symphony Orchestra conducted by Alexander Gibson on the BBC Third Programme
BBC Proms premiere: 8 August 1956 by the BBC Symphony Orchestra conducted by the composer

Commercial recordings
1955  Malcolm Arnold and the Royal Philharmonic Orchestra on Philips Records NBL5021 (re-released on EMI 382 1462 (Conducted by the composer))
1976  Charles Groves and the Bournemouth Symphony Orchestra on EMI Classics HMV ASD 3353 (LP) CDM 566324-2 (CD) (Recorded by the dedicatee)
1995: Richard Hickox and the London Symphony Orchestra on Chandos Records CHAN 9335 
1996: Andrew Penny and the RTÉ National Symphony Orchestra on Naxos Records 8.553406 (recorded 10–11 April 1995, in the presence of the composer)
1994: Vernon Handley and the Royal Philharmonic Orchestra

References

External links
Chester-Novello page on the Symphony Contains programme notes by the composer.

Symphony No. 2
1953 compositions